Felix Hormuth (born 1975) is a German astronomer, working at the Max Planck Institute for Astronomy (MPIA) until 2016, and a prolific discoverer of minor planets. During his stay at the Calar Alto Observatory in Spain, he has discovered many asteroids, including a Jupiter trojan and two near-Earth objects, such as the 15-meter Amor asteroid , using MPIA's 1.23-meter reflector telescope.

Career 

Hormuth has worked with data obtained by the Infrared Space Observatory, was involved in the measurement campaign of the Very Large Telescope's GRAVITY-interferometer, and participated in the construction of optical instruments used at the NTT in La Silla, Chile. As of 2016, he is a project manager at MPIA, working for the Institute's hardware contribution to ESA's space-based Euclid mission, which will accurately measure the acceleration of the universe for the study of dark energy and dark matter.

The Minor Planet Center ranks him 127th for a total of 75 credited discoveries of numbered asteroid during 2003–2009. Hormuth has named his discovered main-belt asteroids 241475 Martinagedeck and 342843 Davidbowie after actors and songwriter Martina Gedeck and David Bowie, respectively. He has also named 18610 Arthurdent after the character in Douglas Adams's radio play and book The Hitchhiker's Guide to the Galaxy.

Honors and awards 

The asteroid 10660 Felixhormuth was named in his honor by astronomers Lothar Kurtze and Lutz Schmadel. The outer main-belt asteroid, provisionally designated 4348 T-1, was discovered by Dutch and Dutch–American astronomers during the Palomar–Leiden trojan survey in 1971. Based on an absolute magnitude of 13.9, it measures about 4 to 10 kilometers in diameter.

List of discovered minor planets

See also

References

External links 
 Douglas Adams – The more than complete The Hitchhiker's Guide, inertramblings.com, 2003
 David Bowie may be gone, but he will live on in space globalnews.ca, January 2016
 Heidelberger Astronom (er)fand den Kleinplaneten "Martinagedeck" Interview (in German) with Felix Hormuth in 2015
 Sternwarte Weinheim (Observatory code A23)

1975 births
Discoverers of asteroids

Living people